Mordellistena gfelleri is a beetle in the genus Mordellistena of the family Mordellidae. It was described in 1990 by Horak.

References

gfelleri
Beetles described in 1990